Sander Martin Levin (born September 6, 1931) is an American politician who served in the United States House of Representatives from 1983 to 2019, representing  (numbered as the  from 1983 to 1993 and as the  from 1993 to 2013). Levin, a member of the Democratic Party from Michigan, is a former ranking member on the House Ways and Means Committee; he was Chairman of the Ways and Means Committee from 2010 to 2011. He is the older brother of former U.S. Senator Carl Levin, and the father of former Congressman Andy Levin, his successor.

In December 2017, Levin announced that he would retire from Congress at the end of his current term, and not seek re-election in 2018. His son Andy was elected on November 6, 2018, and took office in the 116th Congress, which commenced on January 3, 2019.

Early life and education
Levin was born in Detroit, Michigan, the son of Jewish parents Bess Rachel (née Levinson) and Saul R. Levin. He graduated from Central High School in Detroit, received a bachelor's degree from the University of Chicago in 1952, a Master's degree in international relations from Columbia University in 1954, and a law degree from Harvard Law School in 1957. Afterwards, he developed a private practice in Detroit.

State politics
Levin was named chairman of the Oakland County Democratic Party in 1962. He was elected as State Senator for the 13th district in 1964, defeating Republican George W. Kuhn.
Levin served in the position until 1970. Following the 1967 resignation of Michigan Democratic Party chairman Zolton Ferency, Levin was elected state party chairman on December 17. He resigned his position as minority floor leader the following January. He served as Senate minority leader from January 1969 to January 1970, when he resigned to run for governor.

He made unsuccessful campaigns for Governor of Michigan in 1970 and 1974, both times losing to Republican William Milliken. He was a Fellow of the Harvard Kennedy School in 1975. From 1977 through 1981 he was assistant administrator of the Agency for International Development.

U.S. House of Representatives

Elections
In 1982, incumbent Democratic U.S. Congressman William Brodhead decided not to run for re-election, instead making an unsuccessful run for governor. Levin won the Democratic primary in Michigan's 17th congressional district with 49% of the vote, which at that time included northwestern Detroit as well as parts of Macomb and Oakland counties. Levin subsequently won this 1982 general election with 67% of the vote. He typically won re-election with at least 56% of the vote since then, exceptions being 1992 and 1994 elections. After the 1990 United States Census, his district was renumbered as the 12th district and lost its share of Detroit. In 1992, he narrowly defeated businessman and Vietnam War veteran John Pappageorge 53%-46%. In a 1994 rematch, Levin again defeated this same opponent, during the midst of the Republican Revolution, 52%-47%. Then again in 1996, Levin defeated Pappageorge by a larger margin in a third rematch 57%-41%. In 1998, Levin won re-election against Republican nominee Leslie A. Touma, 56%-42%. In 2000, Detroit Metro area businessman Bart Baron gained the endorsement of the United Auto Workers Union, but Levin still managed to win re-election with 64% of the vote. The 2000s redistricting added heavily Democratic Southfield and Mount Clemens to the district, and he won re-election in every election with at least 61% of the vote since.

2012

After redistricting, Levin's district was merged with the 9th District of fellow Democrat Gary Peters.  The district retained Peters' district number—the 9th—but geographically was more Levin's district. Peters opted to run in the newly redrawn 14th District. This effectively handed the Democratic nomination to Levin. While he lost Southfield to the 14th, it picked up the rest of Royal Oak, as well as Oak Park, Clawson and Berkley, among other locations. It was no less Democratic than its predecessor, and Levin breezed to a 16th term with 61.4 percent of the vote.

Committee assignments
 Committee on Ways and Means (former Ranking Member)
 Subcommittee on Trade (Ranking Member)
 Subcommittee on Income Security

Levin took over as chairman of the Ways and Means committee on March 4, 2010, when Charles B. Rangel of New York stepped aside in due to a number of ethics violations. Levin served as chairman until January 2011 and ranking member until the end of 2016.

Levin was a member of the House Baltic Caucus and the Congressional Arts Caucus.

Political positions

Foreign policy
As a member of Congress, Levin was a supporter of Israel. He supported the nuclear deal with Iran, and said that Israel, the region, and the world would be more secure under the Iran nuclear deal.

Personal life
His wife of 50 years, Vicki Schlafer, died on September 4, 2008. They had four children: Andy, Jennifer, Madeleine, and Matthew and ten grandchildren.

In a private ceremony in July 2012, Levin married Pamela Cole, age 61, a Pennsylvania State University psychology professor who studies emotional development. They met through his late wife Vicki. Cole and Levin worked to create a fund in her name for young professionals researching early childhood development.

Levin comes from a family that has long been prominent in Michigan politics. His younger brother Carl Levin was the state's senior Senator until his retirement in January 2015. His uncle, Theodore, was a federal judge. His first cousin Charles was a Michigan Supreme Court justice, after serving as a Michigan Court of Appeals judge. Another first cousin, Joseph Levin, was a candidate for the U.S. House of Representatives. His son Andy Levin was an unsuccessful candidate for the Michigan Senate in 2006, but in 2018 was elected to succeed him in the United States House of Representatives.

Electoral history

|+ : Results 1982–1990
! Year
!
! Democratic
! Votes
! %
!
! Republican
! Votes
! %
!
! Third party
! Party
! Votes
! %
!
|-
|1982
||
| |Sander Levin
| |116,901
| |67%
|
| |Gerald Rosen
| |55,620
| |32%
|
| |Virginia Cropsey
| |Libertarian
| |2,955
| |2%
|
|-
|1984
||
| |Sander Levin
| |133,064
| |100%
|
| |No candidate
|
|
|
|
|
|
|
|
|-
|1986
||
| |Sander Levin
| |105,031
| |76%
|
| |Calvin Williams
| |30,879
| |22%
|
| |Charles Martell
| |Independent
| |1,477
| |1%
|
|-
|1988
||
| |Sander Levin
| |135,493
| |70%
|
| |Dennis Flessland
| |55,197
| |29%
|
| |Charles Hahn
| |Libertarian
| |2,333
| |1%
|
|-
|1990
||
| |Sander Levin
| |92,205
| |70%
|
| |Blaine Lankford
| |40,100
| |30%
|
|
|
|
|
|

|+ : Results 1992–2010
! Year
!
! Democratic
! Votes
! %
!
! Republican
! Votes
! %
!
! Third party
! Party
! Votes
! %
!
! Third party
! Party
! Votes
! %
!
! Third party
! Party
! Votes
! %
|-
|1992
||
| |Sander Levin
| |137,514
| |53%
|
| |John Pappageorge
| |119,357
| |46%
|
| |Charles Hahn
| |Libertarian
| align="right" |2,751
| align="right" |1%
|
|! style="background:#00bfff; "|R. W. Montgomery
|! style="background:#00bfff; "|Natural Law
|! style="background:#00bfff; "|1,724
|! style="background:#00bfff; "|1%
|
|
|
|
|
|
|-
|1994
||
| |Sander Levin
| |103,508
| |52%
|
| |John Pappageorge
| |92,762
| |47%
|
| |Jerome White
| |No party affiliation
| |1,386
| |1%
|
|! style="background:#00bfff; "|Eric Anderson
|! style="background:#00bfff; "|Natural Law
|! style="background:#00bfff; "|1,340
|! style="background:#00bfff; "|1%
|
|
|
|
|
|
|-
|1996
||
| |Sander Levin
| |133,436
| |57%
|
| |John Pappageorge
| |94,235
| |41%
|
| |Albert Titran
| |Libertarian
| |3,101
| |1%
|
|! style="background:#00bfff; "|Gail Petrosoff
|! style="background:#00bfff; "|Natural Law
|! style="background:#00bfff; "|1,690
|! style="background:#00bfff; "|1%
|
|
|
|
|
|
|-
|1998
||
| |Sander Levin
| |105,824
| |56%
|
| |Leslie Touma
| |79,619
| |42%
|
| |Albert Titran
| |Libertarian
| |2,813
| |1%
|
|! style="background:#00bfff; "|Fred Rosenberg
|! style="background:#00bfff; "|Natural Law
|! style="background:#00bfff; "|1,172
|! style="background:#00bfff; "|1%
|
|
|
|
|
|
|-
|2000
||
| |Sander Levin
| |157,720
| |64%
|
| |Bart Baron
| |78,795
| |32%
|
| |Thomas Ness
| |Green
| |4,137
| |2%
|
| |Andrew LeCureaux
| |Libertarian
| |3,630
| |1%
|
|! style="background:#00bfff; "|Fred Rosenberg
|! style="background:#00bfff; "|Natural Law
|! style="background:#00bfff; "|887
|! style="background:#00bfff; "|0%
|
|-
|2002
||
| |Sander Levin
| |140,970
| |68%
|
| |Harvey Dean
| |61,502
| |30%
|
| |Dick Gach
| |Libertarian
| align="right" |2,694
| align="right" |1%
|
| |Steven Revis
| |U.S. Taxpayers
| |1,362
| |1%
|
|
|
|
|
|
|-
|2004
||
| |Sander Levin
| |210,827
| |69%
|
| |Randell Shafer
| |88,256
| |29%
|
| |Dick Gach
| |Libertarian
| |5,051
| |2%
|
|
|
|
|
|
|
|
|
|
|
|-
|2006
||
| |Sander Levin
| |168,494
| |71%
|
| |Randell Shafer
| |62,689
| |26%
|
| |Andrew LeCureaux
| |Libertarian
| |3,259
| |1%
|
| |Jerome White
| |No party affiliation
| |1,862
| |1%
|
| |Art Myatt
| |Green
| |1,735
| |1%
|
|-
|2008
||
| |Sander Levin
| |225,094
| |72%
|
| |Bert Copple
| |74,565
| |24%
|
| |John Vico
| |Libertarian
| |4,767
| |2%
|
| |Les Townsend
| |U.S. Taxpayers
| |4,076
| |1%
|
| |William Opalicky
| |Green
| |3,842
| |1%
|-
|2010
||
| |Sander Levin
| |124,671
| |61%
|
| |Don Volaric
| |71,372
| |35%
|
| |Julia Williams
| |Green
| |3,038
| |1%
|
| |Leonard Schwartz
| |Libertarian
| |2,342
| |1%
|
| |Les Townsend
| |U.S. Taxpayers
| |2,285
| |1%
|*

|+ : Results 2012–
! Year
!
! Democratic
! Votes
! %
!
! Republican
! Votes
! %
!
! Third party
! Party
! Votes
! %
!
! Third party
! Party
! Votes
! %
!
! Third party
! Party
! Votes
! %
!
|-
|2012
||
| |Sander Levin
| |208,846
| |62%
|
| |Don Volaric
| |114,760
| |34%
|
| |Jim Fulner
| |Libertarian
| align="right" |6,100
| align="right" |2%
|
| |Julia Williams
| |Green
| |4,708
| |1%
|
| |Les Townsend
| |U.S. Taxpayers
| |2,902
| |1%
|
|-
|2014
||
| |Sander Levin
| |136,342
| |60%
|
| |George Brikho
| |81,470
| |36%
|
| |Gregory Creswell
| |Libertarian
| align="right" |4,792
| align="right" |2%
|
| |John McDermott
| |Green
| |3,153
| |1%
|
|
|
|
|
|
|-
|2016
||
| |Sander Levin
| |199,661
| |58%
|
| |Christopher Morse
| |128,937
| |37%
|
| |Matthew Orlando
| |Libertarian
| align="right" |9,563
| align="right" |3%
|
| |John McDermott
| |Green
| |6,614
| |2%
|
|
|
|
|
|

See also
 List of Jewish members of the United States Congress

References

External links
 
 
 

|-

|-

|-

|-

|-

|-

|-

1931 births
20th-century American politicians
21st-century American politicians
Democratic Party members of the United States House of Representatives from Michigan
Harvard Law School alumni
Jewish members of the United States House of Representatives
Harvard Kennedy School staff
Lawyers from Detroit
Sander
Living people
Democratic Party Michigan state senators
Politicians from Detroit
School of International and Public Affairs, Columbia University alumni
University of Chicago alumni
Central High School (Detroit) alumni
21st-century American Jews
American Jews from Michigan